Arthur Moreira Lima (born July 16, 1940, in Rio de Janeiro, Brazil) is a Brazilian classical pianist.

Moreira Lima began learning the piano at the age of six. In 1965, he won second prize in the VII International Chopin Piano Competition, as well as the audience prize and best sonata performance. In addition, he won third prize at the 1969 Leeds International Piano Competition and third prize at the 1970 International Tchaikovsky Competition.

In the 1970s Moreira Lima recorded all of Chopin's works; he has also recorded the music of Ernesto Nazareth and Brasílio Itiberê da Cunha.

Moreira Lima has travelled across Brazil playing classical music to communities.

References

External links 
 Official website (Portuguese)

Living people
1940 births
Brazilian classical pianists
Male classical pianists
Prize-winners of the International Chopin Piano Competition
Prize-winners of the Leeds International Pianoforte Competition
Prize-winners of the International Tchaikovsky Competition